Harlem Springs is an unincorporated community in central Lee Township, Carroll County, Ohio, United States.  It has a post office with the ZIP code 44631.  It lies along State Route 43. The community is part of the Canton–Massillon Metropolitan Statistical Area.

History 
The village was established by Isaac Wiggins on March 15, 1832 as "Harlem" on the site of natural springs

Education
Students attend the Carrollton Exempted Village School District

From 1858 to 1867 the Rural Seminary, also known as Harlem Springs College inhabited the town.  It later moved and became known as Scio College and eventually merged with Mount Union College.

References

Unincorporated communities in Carroll County, Ohio
Unincorporated communities in Ohio